The Shire of Burnett was a local government area located in the Wide Bay–Burnett region of Queensland, Australia. It existed as a local government entity from its creation through the amalgamation of the Shire of Gooburrum and the Shire of Woongarra in 1994 until 2008, when it amalgamated with the City of Bundaberg and other councils in the region to form the Bundaberg Region.

History
On 21 November 1991, the Electoral and Administrative Review Commission, created two years earlier, produced its second report, and recommended that local government boundaries in the Bundaberg area be rationalised. The Local Government (Bundaberg and Burnett) Regulation 1993 was gazetted on 17 December 1993, in effect amalgamating the Shires of Gooburrum and Woongarra, and transferring a newer urban area to the City of Bundaberg. On 30 March 1994, the Shire of Burnett came into being.

On 15 March 2008, under the Local Government (Reform Implementation) Act 2007 passed by the Parliament of Queensland on 10 August 2007, the Shire of Burnett merged with the City of Bundaberg and the Shires of Isis and Kolan to form the Bundaberg Region.

Population

* Excluding the area transferred to City of Bundaberg in 1994, the population of Burnett was 15,417 in 1991.

Towns and localities
The Shire of Burnett included the following settlements:

North Burnett area:
 Abbotsford
 Avondale
 Bucca
 Fairymead
 Gooburrum
 Littabella
 Meadowvale
 Miara
 Moore Park
 Moorland
 Oakwood
 Rosedale1
 Sharon
 South Kolan
 Watalgan
 Waterloo
 Waterloo
 Winfield
 Yandaran

South Burnett area:
 Alloway
 Bargara2
 Branyan
 Burnett Heads
 Calavos
 Coonarr
 Coral Cove2
 Electra
 Elliott
 Elliott Heads2
 Givelda
 Innes Park2
 Kalkie2
 Kinkuna
 Mon Repos2
 Pine Creek
 Port of Bundaberg
 Qunaba2
 Rubyanna2
 South Bingera
 Windermere2
 Woongarra

1 - split with Gladstone Region
2 - split with the former City of Bundaberg

External links

References

Former local government areas of Queensland
2008 disestablishments in Australia
Populated places disestablished in 2008